Fear Clinic is a 2009 web series that was directed by Robert Green Hall and distributed through FEARnet. The series comprised five webisodes and starred Robert Englund, Kane Hodder, Danielle Harris, and Lisa Wilcox. Englund commented that it was initially difficult for him to "wrap [his] head around the idea of the webisode because it’s consolidated storytelling". A feature-length film was released on October 22, 2014.

Synopsis
The series follows Dr. Andover (Robert Englund) a psychiatrist that desires to cure the fears of the population despite having lost his medical license. Andover has created the "Fear Chamber", a device that will totally immerse the patient in his or her worst fear. His techniques don't seem to work on everyone, as in the case of Susan (Danielle Harris), a woman that Andover is keeping captive until he can cure her.

Cast
 Robert Englund as Dr. Andover
 Kane Hodder as Villatoro
 Danielle Harris as Susan
 Lisa Wilcox as Nurse Owens
 Angel Oquendo as Garcia
 Kate Nauta as Jackie
 Tory Kittles as Jonte
John F. Beach as Ajax
 Lucas Till as Brett

Episodes

Film

In 2011 Englund stated that he, Harris, and Till were interested in starring in a feature film adaptation of the series that would expand upon the story line from the web series. Robert Hall returned to direct the film, and raised part of the movie's funding through fan donations on the crowdfunding website Indiegogo. Harris later withdrew from the project for unspecified reasons, and it was later announced that actors Fiona Dourif, Thomas Dekker, and Cleopatra Coleman were attached to the project. Hall began filming in late 2013 in Medina, Ohio.

Of the film, Englund commented that the series had initially been envisioned as a feature film entitled Fear Chamber and had gone through several iterations before becoming the web series and eventually in film format.

Awards

References

External links
 
 
 

American drama web series
Horror fiction web series